Hilden Süd station is in the city of Hilden in the German state of North Rhine-Westphalia. It is on the Düsseldorf–Solingen railway, which was opened on 3 January 1894 by the Prussian state railways. The station was also opened in 1976 or 1977 and it is classified by Deutsche Bahn as a category 5 station.

The station is served by line S 1 of the Rhine-Ruhr S-Bahn, running between Dortmund and Solingen every 20 minutes during the day.

It is also served by four bus routes, operated by Rheinbahn, generally at 20-minute intervals: 741, 781, 782 and 785.

References

Footnotes

Sources

Rhine-Ruhr S-Bahn stations
S1 (Rhine-Ruhr S-Bahn)
Railway stations in Germany opened in 1976
Railway stations in Germany opened in 1977